Jeci Aquino Lapus (April 13, 1953 – July 11, 2021) was a Filipino engineer and politician who served as a member of the House of Representatives of the Philippines representing Tarlac's 3rd congressional district from 2007 to 2013. Prior to his death, he was the acting administrator of the Local Water Utilities Administration (LWUA) since 2017.

Early life and education 
Lapus was born on April 13, 1953 in Tarlac, Tarlac to Jesus Lapus and Estrella Aquino. He was the younger brother of Jesli Lapus and a member of the Aquino family, being a cousin of former President of the Philippines Benigno Aquino III.

He graduated from Mapúa University with a bachelor's degree in civil engineering. In 1975, he passed the civil engineering board examination administered by the Professional Regulation Commission. He held an honorary doctorate from Tarlac Agricultural University and also studied business management at the Asian Institute of Management.

Career 
A civil engineer by profession, Lapus worked for various private construction companies and government offices early in his career including at the United Coconut Planters Bank, National Irrigation Administration, and Philippine Tourism Authority. From 1998 to 2000, he was vice president of the National Agri-Business Corporation under the Department of Agriculture. He was president of TODO Foundation, Inc. from 1998 to 2005. He also served as a director of PNOC Exploration Corporation.

During the 2004 general elections, Lapus ran as mayor of Concepcion, Tarlac but lost. In 2007, he was elected to the House of Representatives replacing the seat of his brother who resigned to become Secretary of Education. He was endorsed by then-President Gloria Macapagal Arroyo and ran under Lakas–CMD. He ran and won a second term during the 2010 elections, serving until 2013. In the 14th Congress, he was vice chairman of the committees on Good Government and Public Accountability, Information and Communications Technology, and Public Information.

In 2014, Lapus was elected as director of BDO's leasing and finance subsidiary. He previously served as independent director of PCIBank Group's leasing and finance subsidiary from 2005 to 2006.

In 2017, he was appointed trustee and acting administrator of LWUA. He also became a director of the Philippine Water Works Association due to his position.

Personal life and death 
Lapus was married to Felycette Gay Martinez, an oncologist, and had one child. He was an avid sportsman with interests in golf and horse breeding.

He died on July 12, 2021 at St. Luke's Medical Center – Global City due to heart attack. His body was cremated and interned in Davao.

References 

1953 births
2021 deaths
Filipino civil engineers
21st-century Filipino politicians
Aquino family
Members of the House of Representatives of the Philippines from Tarlac
Mapúa University alumni
People from Tarlac City
Duterte administration personnel
National Unity Party (Philippines) politicians
Lakas–CMD politicians